Mel Alexenberg (born February 24, 1937) is an American-Israeli artist, art educator, and writer recognized for his pioneering work exploring the intersections of art, science, technology and digital culture. He created the first digital computer generated painting in 1965, experimental digital fine art prints in the 1980s that are in 30 museum collections worldwide, circumglobal cyberangel flights honoring Rembrandt in 1989 and in 2019, and a dialogue between tactile artworks and NFTs. Alexenberg has educated generations of young artists as professor at Columbia University and universities in Israel, research fellow at MIT Center for Advanced Visual Studies, dean at New World School of the Arts in Miami, and head of the art department at Pratt Institute where he taught the first course on creating art with computers.

Early life and education

Mel (Menahem) Alexenberg was born to Abraham and Jeanne Alexenberg in New York City. His integration of art and science had its origins in his childhood summers in the Catskill Mountains studying the creatures of the forests and ponds and making drawings and paintings of them in their natural habitats and in imaginary worlds. In his teenage years, he would skip school and spend days at the MoMA, The Met, and the Whitney when it was in Greenwich Village.

He earned degrees in biology from Queens College, City University of New York in 1958 and in education from Yeshiva University in 1959. While working in science education and was test center coordinator for the American Association for the Advancement of Science curriculum project “Science: A Process Approach,” he studied at the Art Students League of New York and exhibited his paintings exploring the growth patterns of plants at Ligoa Duncan Gallery on Madison Avenue.

Alexenberg developed a way for children to create a simple computer described in his 1964 paper “The Binary System and Computers” published in the National Science Teachers Association journal Science and Children, now with his other papers in the Smithsonian’s Archives of American Art. He wrote the books Light and Sight and Sound Science inviting children to discover how their senses of sight and hearing reveal the secrets of light and sound.

In 1965, he began his doctoral studies at New York University excited about the artistic possibilities of digital technologies when the first computer plotter arrived at NYU. He was given access to the massive computer to create geometric pictures on rolls of paper on which he painted with colorful pigments in the ancient technique of painting with molten waxes. His computer-generated painting “Noise Control” was reproduced as the cover the April 1966 issue of International Science and Technology. This was the first digital artwork in which a high tech computer generated image was transformed into a high touch painting.

Alexenberg was awarded an interdisciplinary doctorate in art, science, and cognitive psychology from NYU in 1969 for his research on creativity in art and science. He expanded his doctoral dissertation into a book Aesthetic Experience in Creative Process that includes his interviews of prominent American artists and scientists who described how creativity shaped their work.

Works
Experimental artist Mel Alexenberg’s works explore relationships between postdigital art and creative process, virtual and spiritual worlds, space-time systems and digital technologies, life sciences and human perception, participatory art and community collaboration, and tactile art and NFTs. Millions have seen his worldwide art events, environmental sculptures, multi-media installations, blogart narratives, and exhibitions of paintings and prints that explore digital, biological, and global systems. In his extensive writing, Alexenberg documents his creative process as he redefines art for a postdigital age. His papers are in the collection of the Archives of American Art of the Smithsonian Institution.

The First Digital Computer Painting
Mel Alexenberg created the first digital computer-generated painting in the world in 1965 at the Courant Institute of Mathematical Sciences  at New York University where he earned his doctorate exploring relationships between art and science. He programmed instructions for the Institute's huge computer to plot geometric pictures on rolls of paper. He felt that the cold, calculated computer generated drawings in black and white invited a warm, colorful, sensuous response that encaustic paint offered. He painted on the black and white lines of computer printouts with the molten wax technique of encaustic painting developed two millennia ago in Egypt and Greece. His high-tech/high-touch painting based upon noise control algorithms was reproduced as the cover of International Science and Technology, April 1966.

Microscopic Gardens
While working as a science teacher in 1960, Alexenberg began making oil paintings of the beauty hidden in the cellular patterns of leaves that he photographed through a microscope. After having earned a doctorate at NYU in 1969, he taught at Tel Aviv University where he developed a program “From Science to Art” for Israel’s schools.
In 1973, he became art professor at Columbia University where taught the course “Morphdynamics: The Design of Natural Systems” that he created while exploring the cellular structure of plants at New York Botanical Gardens. He made encaustic paintings on photomicrographs of leaf cross-sections mounted on panels shaped to the outer form of the leaves. 
Alexenberg’s solo exhibition “Inside Leaves” at the Jerusalem Botanical Gardens  showed these paintings alongside the actual living plants from 2007 to 2009.

Bioimaging Self-portraits and Mind-Leaping
At MIT Center for Advanced Visual Studies  in the 1980’s, Mel Alexenberg in collaboration with his son Ari created “Inside/Outside: P’nim/Panim” a biofeedback-generated interactive imaging system in which internal body processes create digital self-portraits.

A person sits before a video camera connected to a biofeedback sensor while watching a real-time naturalistic image of one’s self on the video monitor. A feedback loop is created in which changes in one’s internal mind/body state triggers changes in a video image of one’s external self. The perceived video image, in turn, stimulates mind/body changes, and so on in a continuous feedback loop.
Mel and Ari also created “Mind-Leaping Workshops” to develop creativity for the digital age. The workshops were designed for MIT students and corporate executives from multiple fields.

Digitized Homage to Rembrandt

Alexenberg created pioneering computer-generated serigraphs, lithographs, and etchings from 1985-1990. They were first acquired by National Museum of American History, Smithsonian Institution, for its permanent collection as a historical exemplar of the first computer-generated fine art prints. They are also in the collections of thirty museums throughout the world. They were first exhibited in 1987 at High Tech/High Touch: Computer Graphics in Printmaking at Pratt Manhattan Gallery, The Artist and The Computer at Bronx Museum of the Arts, and in a solo exhibition Computer Angels at The Fine Arts Center Art Gallery, State University of New York at Stony Brook. In the 1989 second edition of the classic book The Complete Printmaker, a chapter “Computer Prints” was added that focuses on Alexenberg’s color etching “Corporate Angel.”

His experimental printmaking was praised my MoMA and Smithsonian: "The Committee on Prints of the Museum of Modern Art is pleased to accept this computer-assisted etching of Rembrandt’s imagery. As an example of the innovative technological experimentation taking place at Pratt Graphic Center, it will be of great interest to students of the development of graphic techniques.” "As Chairman of the Department of Social & Cultural History, it gives me great pleasure to acknowledge, on behalf of the National Museum of American History, the receipt of Digitized Homage to Rembrandt: Day Angels presented to our Division of Graphic Arts. This lithograph from a computer-generated image is a most valuable addition to our collection."

Desert Earth and the South Pole
International Desert Earth Archives (IDEA) This global earth-art project was created by Mel Alexenberg at MIT’s Center for Advanced Visual Studies. Earth from the 44 countries in the world that have deserts was collected through diplomatic channels. The earth samples themselves with maps and photographs of the collection sites and official government documents were displayed in a five panel art work exhibited in at The Jewish Museum in New York in 1988. It is in the collection of the Ashdod Art Museum in Israel.

Two Cosmic Pivots: Jerusalem at the South Pole 
This environmental artwork juxtaposes the pivot point at the South Pole around which our planet rotates with Jerusalem, a pivot point from which spiritual energies radiate from the three Abrahamic religions—Judaism, Christianity and Islam. Alexenberg collected earth from two sites in Jerusalem that span two millennia, from the Western Wall where the Temple stood to the college Mercaz Harav founded by Israel’s first chief rabbi Kook. This mixture from the past and future was placed at the South Pole for the exhibition “Imagining Antarctica” at the Nordica Stadtmuseum Linz, Austria, in 1986.

Parentheses of Asia

Mel Alexenberg marked the Parentheses of Asia from Israel to Japan. He collected sand from the beach in Tel Aviv, the west coast of Asia, flew with it to Chikura, a fishing village in Japan at the west coast of Asia. He scored a six-foot parenthesis in the black volcanic sand on the beach in Chikura at the western coast of Asia that he filled with the yellow sand of Tel Aviv. He returned to Tel Aviv with the sand of Chikura that filled the opposite parenthesis that he scored on the Tel Aviv beach. He documented the parentheses of Asia as a serigraph edition that he created and printed at The Israel Museum affiliated graphics center. The surrounding text is written in Hebrew, Japanese, and English.

Four Corners of America
A series of eight artworks linking the four corners of United States was created by Alexenberg as the official artist of Miami’s Centennial in 1996 when he was dean at New World School of the Arts. Sponsored by National Endowment for the Arts and American Airlines with the participation of the President of United States, Alexenberg's artworks connected Miami, San Diego, Seattle, and Portland (Maine). Mayors of these four cities came together in Miami for the opening of his exhibition of multimedia artworks and models of four living sculptures to be photographed as one from outer space.

A digital artwork was an up-link satellite performance using ABC-TV technology in which dancers at the four corner cities dance with each other in real time, interacting in cyberspace on TV screens throughout North America. In a down-to-earth artwork, Mel Alexenberg collected earth from the four corners, mixed them, and placed them in Jerusalem where he took earth that he placed at the geographical center of USA in Lebanon, Kansas.

Cyberangels: Aesthetic Peace Plan for the Middle East
Alexenberg’s exhibition Cyberangels: Aesthetic Peace Plan for the Middle East in 2004 at the contemporary art gallery of the Jewish Museum in Prague proposed that peace in the Middle East can emerge from a fresh metaphor in which the Muslim world sees Israel’s existence as Allah’s will. This metaphor, derived from Islamic art and thought, invites a shift in perception in which peace between the Arab world and Israel is based upon anomalous patterns in Islamic art.

The ambassadors of the United States and Israel to the Czech Republic participated in the exhibition opening. Alexenberg’s aesthetic peace plan anticipated the 2020 “Abraham Accords” in which United Arab Emirates, Bahrain, and Morocco joined Israel in creating the beginning of a peaceful Middle East and North Africa. The colorful explanatory catalog of the exhibition was coupled by the artist’s statement in Leonardo: Journal of the International Society for the Arts, Sciences and Technology (vol. 30, no. 3).

AT&T Circumglobal Cyberangel Flight

An AT&T sponsored telecommunications art event on October 4, 1989 honoring Rembrandt on the 320th anniversary of his death. Alexenberg launched a digitized image of his angel on a circumglobal flight from New York to the Rembrandt Museum in Amsterdam, Israel Museum in Jerusalem, University of the Arts in Tokyo, Museum of Contemporary Art in Los Angeles and back New York. After a five-hour flight around the planet, the deconstructed angel was reconstructed at its starting point.  

When it passed through Tokyo, it was already the morning of October 5th. When it arrived in Los Angeles, it was still October 4th. Cyberangels can not only fly around the globe, they can fly into tomorrow and back into yesterday. Millions throughout North America watched the cyberangel return from its circumglobal flight over the major TV networks' broadcasts from New York . It was featured in sixty newspaper articles and the AT&T annual report.

The AT&T cyberangel flight was preceded in 1987 by Alexenberg’s launching cyberangels from Long Island to connect it to the 48 states on mainland USA.

LightsOROT: Spiritual Dimensions of the Digital Age
LightsOROT is an interactive electronic art environment created by Mel Alexenberg in collaboration with Otto Piene and his colleagues and graduate students at MIT Center for Advanced Visual Studies to explore the spiritual dimensions of the digital age. At Yeshiva University Museum in New York from 1988–89, 25 interactive artworks were exhibited using laser animation, holography, fiber optics, biofeedback-generated imagery, computer graphics, interactive electronic media, and spectral projections.

ARTnews wrote: “Rarely is an exhibition as visually engaging and intellectually challenging as ‘LightsOROT.’ Its success lies in Alexenberg and Piene’s contributions.” The 113 page catalog includes a dialog on "Light, Vision and Art in Judaism" between Alexenberg and Dr. Norman Lamm, President of Yeshiva University, and an introduction by Harvard University Professor Rudolf Arnheim.

Legacy Thrones and Digital Scrolls

The creation of Legacy Thrones and Digital Scrolls is an exemplary model of intergenerational collaboration in creating high touch and high tech art. Artists Mel Alexenberg and Miriam Benjamin worked with art students at the New World School of the Arts together with elders representing three different ethnic communities of Miami. They collaborated in creating Legacy Thrones, monumental works of public art that enrich their shared environment.

Through aesthetic dialogue between young people and elders from the Hispanic, African-American, and Jewish communities, valued traditions of the past were transformed into artistic statements of enduring significance. Together, young and old hands shaped wet clay into colorful ceramic relief elements collaged onto three towering thrones constructed from steel, aluminum, and concrete. Installed in a park facing Biscayne Bay, each twenty-foot high, two-ton throne visually conveys the stories of each of the three ethnic communities of elders in Miami.

A Digital Scrolls project for the same elders was developed for the next year. In contrast to the high touch Legacy Throne project that told the collective story of each ethnic group, the high tech Digital Scroll project told the life stories of each individual elder. Working closely with a computer graphics student, their digitized photos and documents became elements for creating a composite. Intergenerational collaboration in creating Legacy Thrones and Digital Scrolls is an expression of contemporary culture’s way of balancing high tech and high touch experiences.

Tactile Art to Virtual NFTs
Alexenberg's tactile digital prints of the 1980's in 30 museum collections are being partnered with virtual NFTs in 2022. Rapidly developing technologies are giving rise to NFTs where cyberangels residing in blockchains remain ready to fly throughout the world. Like his AT&T and MIT projects, he is working on creating NFTs that can respond to global trends in both real and virtual space and time, artworks that are dynamic, interactive, dialogic, collaborative, kinetic, participatory, responsive, and exploratory – art that leaps out of the blockchain.

Museum Collections
Metropolitan Museum of Art, New York City; Museum of Modern Art. New York City; Everson Museum of Art, Syracuse, New York; National Museum of American History, Smithsonian Institution, Washington, D.C.; Birmingham Museum of Art, Birmingham, Alabama; Hunter Museum of American Art, Chattanooga, Tennessee; Cincinnati Art Museum, Cincinnati, Ohio; Butler Institute of American Art, Youngstown, Ohio; Meridian Museum of Art, Meridian, Mississippi; New Orleans Museum of Art, New Orleans, Louisiana; Nelson-Atkins Museum of Art, Kansas City, Missouri; Midwest Museum of American Art, Elkhart, Indiana; University of Michigan Museum of Art, Ann Arbor, Michigan; San Antonio Museum of Art, San Antonio, Texas; Greenville Museum of Art, Greenville, North Carolina; Fairfield University Art Museum, Fairfield, Connecticut; University of Wyoming Art Museum, Laramie, Wyoming; Art Gallery of Nova Scotia, Halifax, Canada; Israel Museum, Jerusalem, Israel; Ashdod Art Museum, Ashdod, Israel; Haifa Museum of Art, Haifa, Israel; Jewish Museum in Prague, Prague, Czech Republic; Museum of Fine Arts, Budapest, Hungary; mumok-Museum of Modern Art, Vienna, Austria; Malmo Art Museum, Malmo, Sweden; Rembrandt House Museum, Amsterdam, The Netherlands; Art Museum of The Hague, The Hague, The Netherlands; Victoria and Albert Museum, London, England; Queen Victoria Museum and Art Gallery, Launceston, Tasmania, Australia;  Museum of Contemporary Art, Caracas, Venezuela

Writing
Mel Alexenberg documents in his extensive writing his creative process as he redefines art for a postdigital age. The world’s largest library catalog, WorldCat, includes books and articles about Artist/Author Mel Alexenberg and by Mel Alexenberg. The 2022 catalog lists 30 works in 102 publications in 4 languages and 5,153 library holdings.

Books
The Future of Art in a Postdigital Age: From Hellenistic to Hebraic Consciousness (Intellect Books/University of Chicago Press, 2011, ISBN 978-1-84150-377-6), Educating Artists for the Future: Learning at the Intersections of Art, Science, Technology and Culture (Intellect Books/University of Chicago Press, 2008, ISBN 978-1-84150-191-8), The Future of Art in a Digital Age (Intellect Books/University of Chicago Press, 2006, ISBN 1-84150-136-0), Through a Bible Lens: Biblical Insights for Smartphone Photography and Social Media (HarperCollins, 2018, ISBN 978-1-595557124), Aesthetic Experience in Creative Process (Bar-Ilan University Press, 1981, ISBN 965-226-013-4), Light and Sight (Prentice-Hall, 1969), Sound Science (Prentice-Hall, 1968), LightsOROT: Spiritual Dimension of the Electronic Age (MIT and Yeshiva University Museum, 1988), and in Hebrew Dialogic Art in a Digital World (R. Mass Publishers, Jerusalem, 2008, ISBN 978-965-09-0227-8), in process Metaverses: Creating Spiritual and Virtual Worlds

Book Chapters
“Postdigital Relationships between Digital and Hebraic Writing,” Routledge Handbook of Digital Writing and Rhetoric, and chapters in four books published by National Art Education Association: “From Science to Art: Integral Structure and Ecological Perspective in a Digital Age," Interdisciplinary Art Education: Building Bridges to Connect Disciplines and Cultures, “Semiotic Redefinition of Art in a Digital Age,” Semiotics and Visual Culture: Sights, Signs, and Significance, “Space-Time Structures of Digital Visual Culture: Paradigm Shift from Hellenistic to Hebraic Roots of Western Culture,” Inter/Actions/Inter/Sections: Art Education in a Digital Visual Culture, “Legacy Thrones: Intergenerational Collaborations in Creating Multicultural Public Art,” Community Connections: Intergenerational Links in Art Education

Journal Papers
“Art with Computers: The Human Spirit and the Electronic Revolution” The Visual Computer: International Journal of Computer Graphics, “Postdigital Consciousness: A Paradigm Shift from Hellenistic to Hebraic Roots of Western Civilization,” Archithese: International Thematic Review of Architecture, “Ancient Schema and Technoetic Creativity,” Technoetic Arts: A Journal of Speculative Research, “Cyberangels: An Aesthetic Peace Plan for the Middle East,” Leonardo: Journal of the International Society for the Arts, Sciences and Technology, “Wright and Gehry: Biblical Consciousness in American Architecture,” Journal of Cultural Research in Art Education, "An Interactive Dialogue: Talmud and the Net," Parabola: Myth, Tradition, and the Search for Meaning, "Eruv as Conceptual and Kinetic Art," Images: Journal of Jewish Art.

Personal life
Mel Alexenberg married Miriam Benjamin in 1959. Miriam was born in Suriname, where the Amazon River reaches the Atlantic Ocean, and grew up on a farm in Israel. She is an artist who works in ceramics (Pratt MFA). Her high touch artworks compliment Mel's high tech interests. They have a daughter Iyrit, three sons, Ari, Ron and Moshe, grandchildren and great-grandchildren. Mel and Miriam live in Ra'anana, Israel.

Citations

External links

Grandfather of NFTs
future-of-art
The Times of Israel blog
IsraelSeen

American emigrants to Israel
Artists from New York City
Israeli artists
Israeli Jews
Jewish American artists
Queens College, City University of New York alumni
Yeshiva University alumni
New York University alumni
Academic staff of Ariel University
Columbia University faculty
Living people
1937 births
21st-century American Jews